Zakham  is a Pakistani drama series produced by Fahad Mustafa and Dr. Ali Kazmi, directed by Ali Faizan and written by Sameena Ejaz. It originally aired on ARY Digital on 6 May 2017.

Plot
The focus of the story is a home with two aging parents and their adult children. The younger two are single, while the older two are married. The older sister Tehreem (Sarwat Gillani), who appears to be extremely upset by her husband's treatment of her, keeps her feelings to herself in front of her family. She passes away during childbirth in a cruel act of faith, leaving a boy who has just been born. Her husband Khawar (Faisal Qureshi) appears extremely heartbroken at his wife's untimely demise. He mourns her for days, during which his guilty conscience reminds him of the time when he was so cruel and unreasonable with Tehreem. She literally had to walk on eggshells near her husband.

Her baby boy now comes to the hands of her younger sister Takbeer (Madiha Imam) who loves him like his own. A little before Tehreem's death, she was engaged to Moosa (Shahzad Noor) who is her best friend's brother. They both were smitten with each other before engagement and were over the moon with happiness after it. Unfortunately, after Tehreem's death, their marriage is delayed and their conversations revolve around her son Ahmed. Takbeer and Moosa plan to keep him with themselves after marriage since she is the only mother he has ever known. Takbeer asks permission from Khawar to take his son with her when she gets married. This enrages Khawar so much that he snatches Ahmed and takes him away from Takbeer. She asks her father to stop him and he comes up with the solution that Takbeer should marry Khawar. He breaks her engagement with Moosa despite her and Farhan's pleas. Farhan is the youngest of all siblings and very upset at the unfairness of this decision.

Their father (Shabbir Jan) does not change his decision, so Takbeer marries Khawar unwillingly. The story continues to show Takbeer struggling in her marriage with a psychotic husband while facing societal pressures that only makes Takbeer's life more difficult.

At last, Khawar realises his mistake and Khawar, Takbeer and Ahmed live happily ever after.

Cast 
 Madiha Imam as Takbeer
 Faysal Qureshi as Khawar
 Sarwat Gilani as Tehreem (Takbeer's elder sister and Khawar's first wife)
 Shahzad Noor as Moosa
 Adla Khan as Mehwish (Moosa's sister and friend of Takbeer)
 Shabbir Jan as Tehreem and Takbeer's father
 Ismat Iqbal as Zeb (Takbeer's mother)
 Fahim Abbas as Sultaan (Takbeer's elder brother)
 Mariam Mirza as Rashda
 Mehwish Qureshi as Farhat (Sultan's wife)

See also 
 List of programs broadcast by ARY Digital
 2017 in Pakistani television

References

External links 
 
 

2017 Pakistani television series debuts
2017 Pakistani television series endings
ARY Digital original programming
ARY Digital
Pakistani drama television series
Urdu-language television shows